The mathematics of Sudoku refers to the use of mathematics to study Sudoku puzzles to answer questions such as "How many filled Sudoku grids are there?", "What is the minimal number of clues in a valid puzzle?" and "In what ways can Sudoku grids be symmetric?" through the use of combinatorics and group theory.

The analysis of Sudoku is generally divided between analyzing the properties of unsolved puzzles (such as the minimum possible number of given clues) and analyzing the properties of solved puzzles. Initial analysis was largely focused on enumerating solutions, with results first appearing in 2004.

For classical Sudoku, the number of filled grids is 6,670,903,752,021,072,936,960, which reduces to 5,472,730,538 essentially different solutions under the validity preserving transformations. There are 26 possible types of symmetry, but they can only be found in about 0.005% of all filled grids. An ordinary puzzle with a unique solution must have at least 17 clues, but this is not mathematically proven.  There is a solvable puzzle with at most 21 clues for every solved grid, with the largest minimal puzzle found so far has 40 clues in the 81 cells.

Similar results are known for variants and smaller grids. No exact results are known for Sudokus larger than the classical 9×9 grid, although there are estimates which are believed to be fairly accurate.

Puzzles

Minimum number of givens
Ordinary Sudokus (proper puzzles) have a unique solution. A minimal Sudoku is a Sudoku from which no clue can be removed leaving it a proper Sudoku. Different minimal Sudokus can have a different number of clues. This section discusses the minimum number of givens for proper puzzles.

Ordinary Sudoku

Many Sudokus have been found with 17 clues, although finding them is not a trivial task. A paper by Gary McGuire, Bastian Tugemann, and Gilles Civario, released on 1 January 2012, explains how it was proved through an exhaustive computer search that the minimum number of clues in any proper Sudoku is 17.

Symmetrical Sudoku
The fewest clues in a Sudoku with two-way diagonal symmetry (a 180° rotational symmetry) is believed to be 18, and in at least one case such a Sudoku also exhibits automorphism. A Sudoku with 24 clues, dihedral symmetry (a 90° rotational symmetry, which also includes a symmetry on both orthogonal axis, 180° rotational symmetry, and diagonal symmetry) is known to exist, but it is not known if this number of clues is minimal for this class of Sudoku.

Sudokus of other sizes
 6×6(2×3) Sudoku: The fewest clues is 8.
 8×8(2×4) Sudoku: The fewest clues is 14.

Total number of minimal puzzles 
The number of minimal Sudokus (Sudokus in which no clue can be deleted without losing uniqueness of the solution) is not precisely known. However, statistical techniques combined with a generator, show that there are approximately (with 0.065% relative error):
 3.10 × 1037 distinct minimal puzzles,
 2.55 × 1025 minimal puzzles that are not pseudo-equivalent (i.e. same arrangement where all instances of one digit is switched with another digit).

Variants
There are many Sudoku variants, partially characterized by size (N), and the shape of their regions. Unless noted, discussion in this article assumes classic Sudoku, i.e. N=9 (a 9×9 grid and 3×3 regions). A rectangular Sudoku uses rectangular regions of row-column dimension R×C. Other variants include those with irregularly-shaped regions or with additional constraints (hypercube).

Regions are also called blocks or boxes. A band is a part of the grid that encapsulates 3 rows and 3 boxes, and a stack is a part of the grid that encapsulates 3 columns and 3 boxes. A puzzle is a partially completed grid, and the initial values are givens or clues. A proper puzzle has a unique solution. A minimal puzzle is a proper puzzle from which no clue can be removed without introducing additional solutions. See Glossary of Sudoku for other terminology.

Solving Sudokus from the viewpoint of a player has been explored in Denis Berthier's book "The Hidden Logic of Sudoku" (2007) which considers strategies such as "hidden xy-chains".

Mathematical context
The general problem of solving Sudoku puzzles on n2×n2 grids of n×n blocks is known to be NP-complete. 

A puzzle can be expressed as a graph coloring problem. The aim is to construct a 9-coloring of a particular graph, given a partial 9-coloring. The Sudoku graph has 81 vertices, one vertex for each cell. The vertices are labeled with ordered pairs (x, y), where x and y are integers between 1 and 9. In this case, two distinct vertices labeled by (x, y) and (x′, y′) are joined by an edge if and only if:
 x = x′ (same column) or,
 y = y′ (same row) or,
 ⌈ x/3 ⌉ = ⌈ x′/3 ⌉ and ⌈ y/3 ⌉ = ⌈ y′/3 ⌉ (same 3×3 cell)
The puzzle is then completed by assigning an integer between 1 and 9 to each vertex, in such a way that vertices that are joined by an edge do not have the same integer assigned to them.

A Sudoku solution grid is also a Latin square. There are significantly fewer Sudoku grids than Latin squares because Sudoku imposes the additional regional constraint.

Sudokus from group tables
As in the case of Latin squares the (addition- or) multiplication tables (Cayley tables) of finite groups can be used to construct Sudokus and related tables of numbers. Namely, one has to take subgroups and quotient groups into account:

One also says that the latter is a quotient group of the former, because some once different elements become equal in the new group.

Each Sudoku region looks the same on the second component (namely like the subgroup ), because these are added regardless of the first one.
On the other hand, the first components are equal in each block, and if we imagine each block as one cell, these first components show the same pattern (namely the quotient group ). As outlined in the article of Latin squares, this is a Latin square of order .

Now, to yield a Sudoku, let us permute the rows (or equivalently the columns) in such a way, that each block is redistributed exactly once into each block – for example order them .
This of course preserves the Latin square property. Furthermore, in each block the lines have distinct first component by construction
and each line in a block has distinct entries via the second component, because the blocks' second components originally formed a Latin square of order  (from the subgroup ). Thus we arrive at a Sudoku (rename the pairs to numbers 1...9 if you wish). With the example and the row permutation above, we arrive at Grid 2.

For this method to work, one generally does not need a product of two equally-sized groups. A so-called short exact sequence of finite groups
of appropriate size already does the job. Try for example the group  with quotient- and subgroup .
It seems clear (already from enumeration arguments), that not all Sudokus can be generated this way.

Jigsaw sudokus 
A Sudoku whose regions are not (necessarily) square or rectangular is known as a Jigsaw Sudoku. In particular, an N×N square where N is prime can only be tiled with irregular N-ominoes. For small values of N the number of ways to tile the square (excluding symmetries) has been computed . For N ≥ 4 some of these tilings are not compatible with any Latin square; i.e. all Sudoku puzzles on such a tiling have no solution.

Solutions
The answer to the question 'How many Sudoku grids are there?' depends on the definition of when similar solutions are considered different.

Ordinary Sudoku

All solutions 
For the enumeration of all possible solutions, two solutions are considered distinct if any of their corresponding (81) cell values differ. Symmetry relations between similar solutions are ignored., e.g. the rotations of a solution are considered distinct. Symmetries play a significant role in the enumeration strategy, but not in the count of all possible solutions.

The first known solution to complete enumeration was posted by QSCGZ (Guenter Stertenbrink) to the rec.puzzles newsgroup in 2003, obtaining 6,670,903,752,021,072,936,960 distinct solutions.

In a 2005 study, Felgenhauer and Jarvis analyzed the permutations of the top band used in valid solutions. Once the Band1 symmetries and equivalence classes for the partial grid solutions were identified, the completions of the lower two bands were constructed and counted for each equivalence class. Summing completions over the equivalence classes, weighted by class size, gives the total number of solutions as 6,670,903,752,021,072,936,960, confirming the value obtained by QSCGZ. The value was subsequently confirmed numerous times independently. A second enumeration technique based on band generation was later developed that is significantly less computationally intensive.
This subsequent technique resulted in roughly needing 1/97 of the number of computation cycles as the original techniques, but was significantly more complicated to set up.

Essentially different solutions

The sudoku symmetry group 

The precise structure of the sudoku symmetry group can be expressed succinctly using the wreath product (≀). The possible row (or column) permutations form a group isomorphic to S3 ≀ S3 of order 3!4 = 1,296. The whole rearrangement group is formed by letting the transposition operation (isomorphic to C2) act on two copies of that group, one for the row permutations and one for the column permutations. This is S3 ≀ S3 ≀ C2, a group of order 1,2962 × 2 = 3,359,232. Finally, the relabelling operations commute with the rearrangement operations, so the full sudoku (VPT) group is (S3 ≀ S3 ≀ C2) × S9 of order 1,218,998,108,160.

Fixed points and Burnside's lemma 

The set of equivalent grids which can be reached using these operations (excluding relabeling) forms an orbit of grids under the action of the rearrangement group. The number of essentially different solutions is then the number of orbits, which can be computed using Burnside's lemma. The Burnside fixed points are grids that either do not change under the rearrangement operation or only differ by relabeling. To simplify the calculation the elements of the rearrangement group are sorted into conjugacy classes, whose elements all have the same number of fixed points. It turns out only 27 of the 275 conjugacy classes of the rearrangement group have fixed points; these conjugacy classes represent the different types of symmetry (self-similarity or automorphism) that can be found in completed sudoku grids. Using this technique, Ed Russell and Frazer Jarvis were the first to compute the number of essentially different sudoku solutions as 5,472,730,538.

See also
 Combinatorial explosion (with summary of grid count of Sudoku compared to Latin squares)
 Dancing Links
 Glossary of Sudoku
 Sudokian
 Sudoku code

References

Further reading

External links
 V. Elser's difference-map algorithm also solves Sudoku
 Sudoku Puzzle — an Exercise in Constraint Programming and Visual Prolog 7 by Carsten Kehler Holst (in Visual Prolog)
 Sudoku Squares and Chromatic Polynomials by Herzberg and Murty, treats Sudoku puzzles as vertex coloring problems in graph theory.

Sudoku
Latin squares
Abstract strategy games
Recreational mathematics